James Dacres may refer to:

James Richard Dacres (1749–1810), Royal Navy admiral
James Richard Dacres (1788–1853), his son, Royal Navy admiral